Arthur Stanley Gurney, VC (15 December 1908 – 22 July 1942) was an Australian recipient of the Victoria Cross, the highest award for gallantry in the face of the enemy that can be awarded to British and Commonwealth forces.

Military career
Gurney was 33 years old, and a private in the 2/48th Battalion (South Australia), Second Australian Imperial Force during the Second World War when he was awarded the VC (posthumously) for the following deed.

On 22 July 1942 at Tel-el-Eisa, Egypt, during the First Battle of El Alamein, intense machine-gun fire held up the company to which Private Gurney belonged and inflicted heavy casualties on it, including killing or wounding all the officers. Private Gurney, realizing the seriousness of the situation, charged the nearest machine-gun post, silencing the guns and bayoneting three of the crew. He bayoneted two more at a second post before a grenade knocked him down. Picking himself up, he charged a third post and disappeared from view. Later, his comrades, whose advance he had made possible, found his body.

VC citation
Gurney's VC citation appeared in the London Gazette of 8 September 1942, reading:

Legacy
The Stan Gurney ward at the former Repatriation General Hospital, Hollywood, and the Stan Gurney V.C. Memorial Bike Race, held annually in Western Australia, are named in his honour.

Medals
Gurney's medal group, including his Victoria Cross, came into the National Collection in 1994, and is on permanent display at the Australian War Memorial.

References

External links
Peter Brune, 'Gurney, Arthur Stanley (1908–1942)', Australian Dictionary of Biography, Volume 14, Melbourne University Press, 1996, p. 344.
Private A.S. Gurney in The Art of War exhibition at the UK National Archives

1908 births
1942 deaths
Australian World War II recipients of the Victoria Cross
Australian Army personnel of World War II
Australian military personnel killed in World War II
People from Day Dawn
Military personnel from Western Australia
Australian Army soldiers